The Pa-O National Organisation is a Pa-O political party in Myanmar (Burma). Its armed wing, the Pa-O National Army, has between 400 and 700 active personnel.

The PNO administers the Pa-O Self-Administered Zone, which consists of three townships in southern Shan State: Hopong, Hsi Hseng, and Pinlaung townships.

The PNO campaigns for the Pa-O people and promotes agricultural and work programmes across its controlled territory, in additional to building schools and hospitals in the area. The organisation's armed wing, the Pa-O National Army (PNA), is a close ally of the Burmese military while PNO itself has close ties to the military-backed Union Solidarity and Development Party.

References

Political parties in Myanmar
Paramilitary organisations based in Myanmar